Viktoria Ladõnskaja-Kubits (born 20 July 1981 in Anapa) is an Estonian politician and a member of its parliament, or Riigikogu. She represents the Tallinn constituency of Kesklinn, Lasnamäe and Pirita as a member of the Isamaa party. Ladõnskaja was elected to the Riigikogu in the 2015 election with 1,393 personal votes. Before starting her career in politics, Ladõnskaja worked as a freelance journalist and writer.

References

1981 births
Living people
People from Anapa
Members of the Riigikogu, 2015–2019
Members of the Riigikogu, 2019–2023
Estonian journalists
Estonian women journalists
Estonian people of Russian descent
Women members of the Riigikogu
University of Tartu alumni
Russian emigrants to Estonia
21st-century Estonian women politicians